Salomonsen is a surname. Notable people with the surname include:

Finn Salomonsen (1909–1983), Danish ornithologist
Grete Salomonsen (late 20th/early 21st c.), Norwegian film director
Jone Salomonsen (early 21st c.), author of Enchanted Feminism
Sanne Salomonsen (born 1955), Danish singer.
Victor-Ray Salomonsen (early 21st c.), Danish musician in band Mnemic

Danish-language surnames
Norwegian-language surnames